A list of 2 ft 6 in gauge railways in Japan.

Railways

In operation at  
 (operational status unknown)
DisneySea Electric Railway (located in Tokyo DisneySea)

Kurobe Gorge Railway
Kurobe Senyō Railway (private)
Sangi Railway Hokusei Line
Western River Railroad (located in Tokyo Disneyland) (separate  gauge railway named Jolly Trolley previously present)
Yokkaichi Asunarou Railway Hachiōji Line
Yokkaichi Asunarou Railway Utsube Line

Defunct or converted 
Hidaka Takushoku Railway (converted to  gauge) (operating)
Jōshin Dentetsu Jōshin Line (converted to  gauge) (operating)
Kabe Line (converted to  gauge) (operating)
Kintetsu Yunoyama Line (converted to  gauge) (operating)
Kiso Forest Railway (defunct)
Kurama-dera Cable (converted to  gauge) (operating)
Kurihara Den'en Railway Line (converted to  gauge) (defunct)
Kururi Line (converted to  gauge) (operating)
Nagareyama Line (converted to  gauge) (operating)
Ōigawa Railway Ikawa Line (dual gauge lines with  gauge track previously present) (converted to  gauge) (operating)
Okinawa Prefectural Railways (converted to  gauge) (defunct)
Ryūgasaki Line (converted to  gauge) (operating)
Sakagawa Line (defunct)
Tobu Kinugawa Line (converted to  gauge) (operating)
Tōbu Yaita Line (converted to  gauge) (defunct)
Tomakomai Light Railway (converted to  gauge) (operating)
Uchiko Line (converted to  gauge) (operating)

Influence in former colonies 
Taiwan:
Alishan Forest Railway
Taiwan Sugar Railways
TRA Taitung line before 1982

Gallery

See also
Heritage railway
List of track gauges

References

External links
World-wide 30" Gauge Railways and Railroads